The Premier of the Cayman Islands is the political leader and head of government. The post of premier in the Cayman Islands is the equivalent to chief minister or prime minister in other British Overseas Territories. It is the highest political level that can be attained within the British overseas territory. Prior to 2009, the position was known as Leader of Government Business.

The premier and Cabinet (consisting of all the most senior ministers) are collectively accountable for their policies and actions to King Charles III, to the Parliament of the Cayman Islands, to their political party and ultimately to the electorate.

The current premier is Wayne Panton, since 21 April 2021.

Constitutional background
Until 2003 the position had no official recognition, but it was formalized by a constitutional amendment in June 2003, as the Leader of Government Business along with the Leader of the Opposition. Further constitutional amendments in 2009 modified the name to Premier.

List

(Dates in italics indicate de facto continuation of office)

See also
 List of current heads of government in the United Kingdom and dependencies
Politics of the Cayman Islands
Governor of the Cayman Islands

References

Further reading
Cayman Islands Government Portal:
"Message from the LoGB - The National Hurricane Plan"
"Members of the Legislature (MLAs)"
Election Office

Politics of the Cayman Islands
 
Cayman Islands, List of Leaders of Government Business of
Premier